Andrea Álvarez may refer to:

Andrea Álvarez (musician) (born 1962), Argentinean musician 
Andrea Álvarez (footballer) (born 2003), Guatemalan footballer